Coach Design is an Australian bus bodybuilder in Archerfield, Brisbane. Until 1992 it traded as GBW.

References

External links

Bus Australia gallery

Bus manufacturers of Australia
Manufacturing companies based in Brisbane